Aphomia taiwanalis is a species of moth of the family Pyralidae described by Jinshichi Shibuya in 1928. It is found in Taiwan.

References

Moths described in 1928
Tirathabini
Moths of Taiwan